The Men's Hockey Junior Asia Cup is a men's international under-21 field hockey tournament organized by the Asian Hockey Federation. The tournament has been held since 1988 and serves as a qualification tournament for the Men's FIH Hockey Junior World Cup. Competitors must be under the age of 21 as of December 31 in the year before the tournament is held.

The tournament has been won by four different teams: India and Pakistan have the most tiles with three. Malaysia and South Korea have both won the tournament once. The most recent edition was held in Kuantan, Malaysia and was won by India. The next edition, to be held in Dhaka, Bangladesh in 2021, was canceled due to the COVID-19 pandemic.

Results

Summary

* = host nation

Team appearances

See also
 Men's Hockey Asia Cup
 Men's Junior AHF Cup
 Women's Hockey Junior Asia Cup

References

External links
 Asian Hockey Federation
 todor66.com archive

 
Junior
Field hockey
Hockey Junior Asia Cup
Asia Cup